The St. Louis Sun was a short-lived daily newspaper based in St. Louis, published by Ingersoll Publications. The Sun began publishing on September 25, 1989, but was never as competitive as the well-established St. Louis Post-Dispatch. Seven months after it started, the Sun ceased operations on April 25, 1990.

In 1984 Ingersoll Publications Company purchased the free weekly Suburban Journals of Greater St. Louis. In 1985 Ingersoll Publications Company chief executive Ralph Ingersoll II began planning to solidify its entrance into the St. Louis newspaper market. Ingersoll wanted to compete directly with the St. Louis Post-Dispatch, and the failure of the St. Louis Globe-Democrat in 1986 gave him the opportunity to do just that. Ingersoll used high-risk junk bonds to raise millions of dollars to finance a number of newspaper acquisitions including the $20 million his company needed to launch the St. Louis Sun as a tabloid-style paper.

In 1988 Ingersoll Publications purchased The Alton Telegraph and Mississippi Valley Offset, where the paper would be printed. Ingersoll Publications Company announced its Post-Dispatch competitor in March 1989. The tabloid newspaper would be modeled after other papers such as the Rocky Mountain News and Barron's. The Sun began publishing on September 25 with Ingersoll as editor in chief. The paper was the first American metropolitan daily since The Washington Times was published in 1982. For the first three months of 1990, the newspaper claimed sales averaging over 100,000 a day. The Sun earned much local notoriety for a full-tabloid-page headline which read "He Bit Hers, She Sued His", which had to do with a lawsuit by a woman against a man who bit her buttocks. Growth of the Sun'''s circulation nonetheless fell short of the company's expectations in the critical month of April. The paper's business strategy backfired, cannibalizing ad revenues at its sister publication, the Suburban Journals. Ingersoll announced the newspaper's closure April 25, 1990, the newspaper's last edition.

See also
 St. Louis Beacon St. Louis Globe-Democrat''

References

External links 

 St. Louis Sun Newspaper Collection finding aid at the St. Louis Public Library
St. Louis Sun Photograph Collection finding aid at the St. Louis Public Library

1989 establishments in Missouri
1990 disestablishments in Missouri
Defunct newspapers published in Missouri
Newspapers established in 1989
Publications disestablished in 1990
Newspapers published in St. Louis